Vido is an island in Greece.

Vido or VIDO may also refer to:

People
Vido (surname)
Vido Musso, American jazz musician

Other uses
Vaccine and Infectious Disease Organization (VIDO)

See also